125th Anniversary Çayyolu Stage, is a theatre in Çayyolu suburb of Çankaya district in Ankara, Turkey. It is operated by the Turkish State Theatres.

References

Theatres in Ankara
Yenimahalle, Ankara
Turkish State Theatres